Luciano Perazzolo Simonetto Fonseca (born May 11, 1979 in Caxias do Sul), or simply Luciano Fonseca, is a Brazilian attacking midfielder. He currently plays for Clube Esportivo Bento Gonçalves.

Honours
Brazilian Cup: 1999
Goiás State League: 2002
Brazilian Center-West Cup: 2002
Federal District League: 2003

External links

CBF 
zerozero.pt 

1979 births
Living people
Brazilian footballers
Brazilian expatriate footballers
Esporte Clube Juventude players
Goiás Esporte Clube players
Sociedade Esportiva do Gama players
Associação Académica de Coimbra – O.A.F. players
C.D. Nacional players
Sociedade Esportiva e Recreativa Caxias do Sul players
Grêmio Foot-Ball Porto Alegrense players
Iraklis Thessaloniki F.C. players
Esporte Clube São Luiz players
Association football midfielders